Planocarpa is a genus of flowering plants belonging to the family Ericaceae.

Its native range is Tasmania.

Species:

Planocarpa nitida 
Planocarpa petiolaris 
Planocarpa sulcata

References

Epacridoideae
Ericaceae genera